Eric Vinar (31 May 1942 – 13 February 2016) was an Australian rules footballer who played with Fitzroy in the Victorian Football League (VFL).

Born in Czechoslovakia during World War II, Vinar and his family emigrated to Australia several years after the conflict, which had claimed the life of his father. The family settled in Geelong.

Vinar played senior football for North Ballarat, before joining Fitzroy in the 1964 VFL season. He played eight senior games for Fitzroy that year. All were in losses, it was the only winless season in the club's history.

His brother, Paul Vinar, was a member of Geelong's 1963 VFL premiership team.

References

External links

1942 births
VFL/AFL players born outside Australia
Australian rules footballers from Victoria (Australia)
Fitzroy Football Club players
North Ballarat Football Club players
Czechoslovak emigrants to Australia
2016 deaths